The Prussian Settlement Commission, officially known as the Royal Prussian Settlement Commission in the Provinces West Prussia and Posen was a Prussian government commission that operated between 1886 and 1924, but actively only until 1918. It was set up by Otto von Bismarck to increase land ownership by ethnically German Germans at the expense of ethnically Polish Germans, by economic and political means, in Prussia's eastern provinces of West Prussia and the Posen as part of his larger efforts aiming at the eradication of the Polish nation. The Commission was motivated by German racism.

The Commission was one of Prussia's prime instruments in the official policy of Germanization of the historically Polish lands of West Prussia (the former Royal Prussia) and the dissolved Grand Duchy of Posen. The Commission ultimately purchased 613 estates from ethnic German owners and 214 from ethnic Poles, functioning to more often bail out German debtors rather than fulfilling its declared national mission. By the end of its existence, a total of 21,886 German families (154,704 persons) out of a planned 40,000 had been settled. The Commission's activities had a countereffect in Poles using what has been termed "defensive nationalism", unifying "Polish nationalism, Catholicism and cultural resistance" and triggered countermeasures by the Polish minority. Efforts of new private initiatives by the minority of ethnically Polish Germans, but actually a majority in wide parts of Posen and West Prussia province, who founded the Prussian banks Bank Ziemski, Bank Zwiazku Społek Zarobkowych (Vereinsbank der Erwerbsgenossenschaften; cooperative central clearing bank) and local land acquisition cooperatives (spółki ziemskie) which collected private funds and succeeded to buy more latifundia from defaulted owners and settle more ethnically Polish Germans as farmers on the parcelled land than their governmentally funded counter-party. A big success of the Prussian activists for the Polish nation.

Nevertheless, this Polish success under difficult circumstances was little recognised, and after World War I, when the Second Polish Republic was established, new governmental Polish measures climaxed in the expropriation of Commission-owned lands and reversing Germanization. Some of the former colonists, then as ethnically German Poles part of the German minority in Poland, were active in a Nazi campaign of genocide against Poles during World War II.

Name
English translations include German Colonization Commission for Poznań, Prussian Colonization CommissionThe Royal Commission of Colonization for West Prussia and Posnania).
The majority of Polish sources translate the title as Colonization Commission rather than Settlement Commission, which is more politically charged.
The issue of translation is also connected to the fact that in 1904 the legal difference between settlement and colony was abolished in Prussia.

Background

Kingdom of Prussia
The Kingdom of Prussia during the partitions of Poland acquired West Prussia in 1772 and the later Province of Posen in 1793 and 1815. The Polish language was abolished as an official language and the German language was introduced. Frederick the Great hoped to replace Poles with Germans, placing Germans in most of the administration as well. Poles were portrayed as "backward Slavs" by Prussian officials who acted to spread the German language and culture. The lands of Polish nobility were confiscated and given to German nobles. The Prussian hold on Polish areas was somewhat weakened after 1807 when parts of its partition were restored to the Duchy of Warsaw. The power status of Prussia was dependent on hindering any form of Polish statehood and it didn't support Polish attempts at restoration of Poland during Congress of Vienna, when Prussia tried to obtain the Duchy of Warsaw or at least its western provinces. In 1815 the Prussian king made several guarantees in his speech to Poles in the newly formed Grand Duchy of Posen (created out of territories of Duchy of Warsaw) in regards to rights of the Polish language and cultural institutions.

However, in practice, the right to use Polish in courts and institutions was respected only until 1830. While the Poles constituted the majority of population in the area, they held only 4 out of 21 official posts of high level. Despite the colonizing actions between 1793 and 1806, in 1815 in Poznań only 11.1 per cent of the population was ethnically German. 5 After 1832 Poles could no longer hold high posts at the local administrative level (landrat). At the same time the Prussian government and Prussian King pursued Germanization of the administrative and judicial systems, while local officials enforced Germanization of the educational system and tried to eradicate the economic position of Polish nobility. The provincial parliament issued calls to ensure the right of use of the Polish language and called for the creation of Polish educational institutions as well as autonomy, but those requests were rejected by the Prussian state. In 1847 two hundred fifty seven Polish activists were imprisoned upon charges of conspiracy and eight of them were sentenced to death, the Spring of Nations, however, stopped their execution. The Frankfurt Parliament showed that the German delegates refused to accept the rights of non-German peoples and, while the Prussian government declared itself ready to discuss Polish concerns, it soon ordered the Prussian military to crush the freedom movement of Polish activists and peasants. Afterwards, the victorious Prussian government retreated from its earlier declarations of autonomy in the Greater Poland region.

Earlier settlement attempts by the Kingdom of Prussia

Prior to the Prussian Settlement Commission (established in 1886) the Kingdom of Prussia had made a number of attempts to settle ethnic Germans in regions inhabited by ethnic Poles.

Frederick the Great, who treated Poles with contempt and called them 'slovenly Polish trash', settled around 300,000 colonists in the eastern provinces of Prussia and aimed at a removal of the Polish nobility. Another colonization attempt aimed at Germanisation was pursued by Prussia after 1832.

German Empire
In 1871, the German Empire was founded with Prussia being the leading and dominating state. The advent of the Kulturkampf marked a period, when the Prussian government attempted to Germanise the Poles through language, schooling, and religious restrictions. Later, the increase in the sheer numbers of Poles led the government to a direct anti-Polish demographic policy.
The Polish population in the province of Posen (Poznań) made up for nearly 60% (1,049,000 Poles vs 702,000 Germans in 1890), and in West Prussia for one third of the population (484,000 Poles vs 949,000 Germans in 1890). By 1885, Prussia still faced difficulties digesting her "Polish provinces", and the "Polish Question" was one of the Reich's most pressing problems. The state itself was led by German nationalism and Bismarck viewed Poles as one of the chief threata to German power; as he declared The Polish question is to us a question of life and death and wanted Polish nation to disappear in private going as far as expressing his wish to exterminate Poles As a result, the Polish population faced economic, religious and political discrimination the Germanisation of their territories was promoted and in places where Poles and Germans lived a virtual apartheid existed.

In the late 19th century, an east-to west migration (Ostflucht) took place, in which parts of the population of the eastern provinces migrated to western, more prosperous territories.
The German government was concerned that Ostflucht would lower the percentage of Germans in the eastern regions. This event was used as pretext and justification presented to the international community for actions aiming at Germanisation of those provinces. In reality both Poles, Jews and Germans moved to richer western German provinces

Goals

The goals of the Commission were the financial weakening of Polish landowners, and ensuring Germanisation of Polish cities as well as rural areas. The destruction of Polish landownership combined with the fight against the Polish clergy (Kulturkampf) was to achieve the elimination of a Polish national identity. Polish landowners were regarded by Bismarck as the principal agitators for Polish nationalism, purchasing their estates and parceling them out to Germans in family-sized farms was intended to both disestablish this group and significantly increase the numbers of Germans in these areas.

The focus on land ownership was motived by the German "völkisch" idea that "where the German plough will plow, there German fatherland will arise". The settlement was to isolate Polish settlements in German inhabited areas by surrounding them with German settlements and spread German ones into Polish dominated areas to isolate specified Polish villages from the rest. The German settlements were to be always concentrated to provide a "barrier" to Polishness. While the Commission bought mostly German land, this was not interfering with the goal of increase of German presence, and buying a large tract of land from a single German owner to distribute it among many German colonists was perceived as beneficial to the goal. Of the colonists, 96.9% were Protestants as the Prussian authorities believed that ‘the true German is a Protestant". The whole practice was new and unheard in Europe. Besides Ostflucht, the German government justified its action to the international community by labeling Poles as internal enemies of the state. Those attempts did not achieve much success. Bismarck himself said that the Poles who find themselves without land should "move to Morocco".

Funding

The funding for the Commission was:
 1886 100 million marks
 1898 100 million marks
 1908 150 million marks
 1913 500 million marks.

By 1914 the overall funding for the Commission was 955 million marks. Additional funds were awarded to assistance projects such crediting bankrupt German estates (125 million marks in 1908).

Due to operations of the Commission the price of land in Polish territories rose in response. The economical attempt to Germanise those areas failed and with the beginning of World War I German authorities and leading members of Commission started to look for new ways to secure German foothold on Polish territory.

Acquisitions settlement and land purchase

While the commission planned to settle up to 40,000 families in Posen and West Prussia, it only managed to settle a total of 21,866 families until 1914, bringing the number of German colonists to 154,000.

Acquisitions by 1901

From 26 April 1886 until 1 January 1901, the Settlement Commission purchased 147,475 ha (3.64% of the Province of Posen and 1.65% of West Prussia), and settled 4,277 families (about 30,000 persons). A publication from German Empire named Meyers Großes Konversations-Lexikon claimed that in 1905-1906 that only 2,715 families were not native to these provinces. After this, the original budget of 100,000,000 marks was exhausted.

Acquisitions by 1913

By 1913, the SC had bought up about 5.4% of the land in West Prussia and 10.4% in Posen. By then, 450 new villages were founded, a total area of 438,560 ha was purchased, of which 124,903 ha were purchased from Poles. In 1914, Germans owned 59% of land in Province of Posen, while making up for about 40% of population in 1890.

Overall

Throughout its 32 years of existence the Commission was able to buy 8% of the total land in Posen and West Prussia. Altogether, about 22,000 families were settled, bringing the number of German colonists to 154,000. 5,400 families were German arrivals taken from other parts of the partitioned Poland, Congress Poland (Russian Empire province) and Galicia (Austrian province).

Overall, the commission bought 828 estates (430,450 ha) for 443 million marks, 214 of those (115,525 ha) from Poles for 96,4 million marks, and the other 614 (314,926 ha) from Germans for 346,7 million marks. Further the commission bought 631 peasant farms (30,434 ha) for 44,5 million marks, 274 of those (11,152 ha) from Poles for 16,6 million marks and the other 357 (19,282 ha) from Germans for 27,9 million marks. Of the total of 955 million marks spent, about half (488 million marks) was spent for the actual land purchase, while the rest was spent for administration, parcellisation, infrastructure etc.

Origin of the settlers
To Germanise the region predominantly German military units were sent and later included in the region's population figures.
Germans from West Prussia and Greater Poland region who took part in the settlement process declined over time, while the number of Germans from the Russian Empire increased. In the first years (1886–90), locals from Greater Poland and West Prussia constituted 48% of the settlers while the proportion of Germans from Russia was below 1%, however in the years 1902–1906, locals only made up for 17% and Germans from Russia for 29% of the settlers.

Of those settled until the end of 1906, a quarter originated in Posen and West Prussia, another quarter in the neighboring provinces of East Prussia, Pomerania, Brandenburg, Saxony and Silesia, 30% from other parts of the German Empire and 20% from outside the empire, especially from Russia.

Impact on the ethnic composition

One of the chief aims of the Commission was to stop the restoration of Polish population in Germanised territories of Greater Poland which was restoring its numbers after drastic fall during initial Prussian takeover. While the Commission never fully realised its goals, it managed to weaken Polish influence.
In Greater Poland the Polish share of the population didn't reach its pre-1815 levels:

According to Władysław Kulski the Commission was only a part of the German efforts to eradicate Poles from territories conquered by Prussia from Poland;in addition to 154,000 colonists, Germany also settled 378,000 German military personnel and officials in Polish territories.

Legislation

As the economic approach showed to be a failure, various laws were enacted to promote the Settlement Commission's aims.

 1896: Land acquired from the commission could be sold freely only to the settler's next of kin: the commission's approval was required for any other sale.
 1904: The Prussian Government sought to restrict Poles from acquiring land, if this would interfere with the goals of the commission. Any new settlement required a building permit, even if it were only for renovation of an existing building to make it habitable. Local officials routinely denied these permits to Poles. The law faced international criticism and opposition from liberal groups concerned about private property rights. The Prussian Administrative High Court ended this legislation
 1908: The Prussian diet passed a law permitting the forcible expropriation of Polish landowners by the Settlement Commission. In 1912, four Polish large estates of 1,656 ha were expropriated. The law faced criticism from international community and liberals concerned about the free market rights. Additionally, the Austrian State Council, upon the request of the Poles, who enjoyed considerable autonomy and influence in Austro-Hungary, condemned the actions of German government. Rota, a patriotic poem by Maria Konopnicka was created as response to this law. According to historian Andrzej Chwalba, more than one newspaper in Europe wrote that Prussia was becoming a police state. In part due to those protests, the law's execution was delayed until 1914.
 1913: To prevent Poles redistributing their land to other Poles, a law was passed that forbade the dividing of private land without the agreement of the state.

Other measures in support of the Germanisation policy included:
 Ethnic Germans were favoured in government contracts and only they won them, while Poles always lost.
 Ethnic Germans were also promoted in investment plans, supply contracts.
 German craftsmen in Polish territories received the best locations in cities from authorities so that they could start their own business and prosper.
 Soldiers received orders that banned them from buying in Polish shops and from Poles under the threat of arrest.
 German merchantmen were encouraged to settle in Polish territories.
 Tax incentives and beneficial financial arrangements were proposed to German officials and clerks if they would settle in Polish inhabited provinces.

Polish countermeasures

The creation of the Commission stimulated Poles to take countermeasures, that gradually turned into a competition of the Polish minority against the German state with Poles running their own settlement banks and settlement societies, resulting in a "battle for soil" (Kampf um den Boden). In 1888 Teodor Kalkstein founded Bank Ziemski, supported by Poles from Austrian Galicia region. 1894 saw Polish intellectuals in cooperation with Polish farmers founding Spólka Rolników Indywidualnych. Ignacy Sikorski founded Bank Parcelacyjny in 1896. From 1890 till 1912 Polish enterprises, banks and associations grew in number and strength providing Poles with defence against the Germanisation of their land. The efforts to Germanise the region in fact strengthened the Polish nationalist movement and united Polish nationalism, Catholicism and cultural resistance among the Poles in Pomerania, Masuria and Silesia. For the Settlement Commission, these countermeasures led to a decreasing availability of purchasable Polish-owned land, in 1895 and all years following 1898, the vast majority of estates was purchased from Germans instead of Poles, and since 1902, the commission was able to acquire land from Poles "only rarely and only through a middleman".

Numerous initiatives proved to be more elastic and efficient then the large centralised German bureaucracy. A social understanding has risen among the Polish population that led to abandoning the class differences in order to defend national existence - the rich helped the poor to perform better in economy and were supported by the clergy in their actions. Rich nobility often sold their artistic heritage to invest in banking and financial enterprises, or to buy more land for Poles. This was viewed as moral and ethical behavior among the Polish population. Some Polish nationalists accused the Settlement Commission of being run by Germans and Jews, and distributed a leaflet in 1912 that warned "any Pole who buys from Jews and Germans undermines the existence of the Catholic Church and the Fatherland." Local newspapers attempted to intimidate residents who purchased goods from German and Jewish merchants by publishing their names in the paper and accusing them of "betray[ing]...their country."

As a result, the German initiative created the very thing it tried to eliminate in the first place, a Polish national awakening in the Greater Poland region (province of Posen) and feeling of Polish national unity.
Thus, faced with the inability to Germanise the Polish provinces by economic means led the German leaders and thinkers to consider pursuing extraordinary means. Catherine Epstein named Polish resistance to German methods as strengthening Polish nationalism and notes the similarity of Commission actions to the Nazis

First World War

Even before the First World War some Germans like Hans Delbrück or Chancellor Bernhard von Bülow proposed expelling Poles from eastern territories of Germany. With the coming of the war, those ideas begun to take real and determined form in the shape of plans to be realised after German victory and as consequence hegemony of Central and Eastern Europe. The idea of extraordinary measures was the result of the failed economic attempt to Germanise Polish provinces. Heads of the Settlement Commission were among the architects and supporters of those plans. The president of the Settlement Commission, Gense, was one of the chief supporters and planners of the so-called "Polish Border Strip" that envisioned expelling circa 2 million non-Germans (chiefly Poles and Jews) from 30,000 square kilometers of the would-be annexed territories from Congress Poland, which would then become Germanised. The Poles remaining in Germany who would refuse to become Germanised were to be "encouraged" to move to a planned German-run Polish puppet state established from the remains of Congress Poland.

Other notable names of Settlement Commission activists include Friedrich von Schwerin and industrialist Alfred Hugenberg who worked for and represented the Krupp family.

Outcome

The Settlement Commission's goal to Germanise Polish territories failed and with the fall of German Empire in 1918 (at the end of World War I), the Commission ceased to function by 1924. In 1919 its headquarters were taken over by Polish state as well as most of its territory. 3.9% (18,200 ha.) of all the land purchased remained in the hands of the Germans within the new borders of Germany. The Germanisation policies resulted in strong measures against the German settlers by the Polish state after World War I. The Polish state refused to recognize the ownership rights of most of the German settlers, about half of whom fled or were driven out of Poland. These actions of the Polish state were condemned by the Permanent Court of International Justice, ruling out in 1923 "that the position adopted by the Polish Government [...] was not in conformity with its international obligations.". By 1918, the total ethnic Polish population was greater than when the Commission began operations. Between 1918 and 1939, the German population in these areas declined by another 70%, and the land owned by Germans by 45%.

Influence on Nazism
Prussian policies of settlement and forced assimilation were an influence for German Nazi thinkers during their war in the East  Their plans were a renovation of the idea, this time however rather than colonize just the land purchased by Prussian Settlement Commission, Poles would be ethnically cleansed and murdered, and German colonists would occupy their place.
The Nazis planned also to form a Reich Settlement Commission to coordinate all internal colonization within German Reich, which was to be based on Prussian Settlement Commission. The plan was laid out by Nazi official Curt von Gottberg, who presented it to Himmler, and as reward was appointed as Land Registry Chief in Prague in June 1939

References

External links

See also
 Anti-Polonism
 Deutscher Ostmarkenverein
 Drzymała's wagon

Organizations of the German Empire
Germany–Poland relations
Prussian Partition
History of Poznań
Kingdom of Prussia
West Prussia
Politics and race
Racism in Germany
Settlement schemes in Europe
19th-century establishments in the Province of Posen
Germanization
Anti-Slavic sentiment